Meir Daloya (born December 7, 1956) is an Israeli former Olympic weightlifter. He was born in Israel, and is Jewish.

Weightlifting career
He came in 8th in the 1981 World Weightlifting Championships, lifting 212.5 kg. The following year he came in 11th in the 1982 World Weightlifting Championships, lifting 217.5 kg.

He competed for Israel at the 1984 Summer Olympics in Los Angeles at the age of 27, in Weightlifting--Men's Flyweight (52 kg). He came in 9th, after lifting .

References

External links
 

Living people
Jewish weightlifters
Weightlifters at the 1984 Summer Olympics
1956 births
Israeli Jews
Israeli male weightlifters
Olympic weightlifters of Israel